The Last Dance is Spice 1's seventh studio album. It was released on May 16, 2000, in the U.S., and features appearances from rap artists MJG, RBL Posse, The Outlawz, Bad Azz, UGK, and C-Bo. This was also his first independent album since leaving Jive. It was well received by fans, praising Spice for returning to his raw lyricism and murderous tales, reminiscent of previous albums such as 187 He Wrote and AmeriKKKa's Nightmare.

Track listing 
 "Player Pieces"
 "20/20's" (ft. Bad Azz)
 "Who Can I Trust?"
 "Murder Man Dance" (ft. UGK)
 "Got Gunz" (ft. Outlawz)
 "G.A.M.E." (ft. Bad Azz, Michelob and 40 Glocc)
 "Thug Thang Y2G" (ft. Black C and Pimp C)
 "How We Ride"
 "Ghetto Soldier" (ft. Sean T and Crime Boss)
 "One Luv" (ft. C-Bo)
 "Gunz & Money"
 "Chocolate Philly" (ft. MJG)

Chart history

References 

Spice 1 albums
2000 albums
G-funk albums